The 2004 British National Track Championships were a series of track cycling competitions held from 7–10 October 2004 at the Manchester Velodrome.

Medal summary

Men's Events

Women's Events

References

National Track Championships
British National Track Championships